Batangi is a village in Abbottabad District of Khyber-Pakhtunkhwa province of Pakistan. It is located at 34°7'40N 73°9'40E. Neighbouring settlements include Biba Dhaka, Darah and Chhar.

References

Batangi is a village near Lora.  It is situated in the north of Lora after crossing the Haro Naddi.  Mian Nawaz Sharif visited there during the heavy rains of 1993.  Some relatives of Jabri villagers reside in Village Batangi.

Populated places in Abbottabad District